The pale green eel (Heteroconger digueti), also known as the pale garden eel or the Cortez garden eel, is an eel in the family Congridae (conger/garden eels). It was described by Jacques Pellegrin in 1923, originally under the genus Taenioconger. It is a nonmigratory marine, deepwater-dwelling eel which is known from the eastern central Pacific Ocean, including the Gulf of California and Mexico.

The pale green eel's  diet consists of zooplankton. Despite its restricted range, the IUCN redlist currently lists the species as Least Concern due to its common local occurrence, and the lack of known major threats.

References

External links
 

Heteroconger
Taxa named by Jacques Pellegrin
Fish described in 1923